Plato is an unincorporated community in Bloomfield Township, LaGrange County, Indiana.

History
A post office opened at Plato in 1890, and remained in operation until it was discontinued in 1901. The community was likely named for the philosopher Plato.

Geography

References

Unincorporated communities in LaGrange County, Indiana
Unincorporated communities in Indiana